The European Convention on the Recognition of the Legal Personality of International Non-Governmental Organisations is an international treaty that sets the legal basis for the existence and work of international non-governmental organizations in Europe. It was adopted by the member states of the Council of Europe, meeting at Strasbourg on 24 April 1986. It entered into force on 1 January 1991; signatory states were Austria, Belgium, France, Greece, Portugal, Slovenia, Switzerland and the United Kingdom.

As of 31 May 2018, the treaty has been ratified by Austria, Belgium, Cyprus, France, Greece, Liechtenstein, North Macedonia, Netherlands, Portugal, Slovenia, Switzerland, and the United Kingdom, and has been extended by the UK to Guernsey, Jersey, and the Isle of Man.

See also

 Legal personality

References

External links
 European Convention on the Recognition of the Legal Personality of International Non-Governmental Organisations, Council of Europe
 European Convention on the Recognition of the Legal Personality of International Non-Governmental Organisations, Ministry of Foreign Affairs, The Netherlands

Council of Europe treaties
Treaties concluded in 1986
Treaties of Austria
Treaties of Belgium
Treaties of Cyprus
Treaties of France
Treaties of Greece
Treaties of the Netherlands
Treaties of Portugal
Treaties of Slovenia
Treaties of Switzerland
Treaties of North Macedonia
Treaties of the United Kingdom
1986 in France
Treaties extended to Guernsey
Treaties extended to Jersey
Treaties extended to the Isle of Man
Treaties entered into force in 1991